The Confederation of Shipbuilding and Engineering Unions (CSEU), often known as the Confed is a trade union confederation in the United Kingdom.

History
The confederation was founded in December 1890 as the Federation of Engineering and Shipbuilding Trades by small craft unions, on the initiative of Robert Knight of the United Society of Boilermakers and Iron and Steel Shipbuilders, primarily in response to the formation of a National Federation of Shipbuilders and Engineers by employers.  By 1895, sixteen unions were affiliated, with a total membership of 150,000.  However, the prominent Amalgamated Society of Engineers (ASE) refused to join.  The ASE finally joined in 1905 but, failing to persuade the other members to unite with it in a single industrial union, withdrew again in 1914.  Meanwhile, unions representing unskilled workers were initially excluded; the National Amalgamated Union of Labour was finally admitted in 1908, and the National Union of Gasworkers and General Labourers in 1910, and only after they had given assurances that they would permit the craft unions to retain a leading role in the organisation.  Because it would not sign a similar agreement, the Workers' Union was never admitted.  In its early years, the Federation focussed on resolving demarcation disputes, but it soon concentrated on making national agreements for the engineering and shipbuilding industries, allowing the largest union in each trade to take the lead in negotiations.

The confederation adopted its current form and name in 1936.  From 1941, the CSEU co-operated with the National Union of Foundry Workers and the Amalgamated Engineering Union in the National Engineering Joint Trades Movement, convincing these two unions to affiliate in 1944 and 1946 respectively.  The confederation then represented the vast majority of unionised workers in the relevant industries.

By 1977, the CSEU had 23 affiliates and 2.4 million members, with most workers organised in the relevant sections of the Transport and General Workers Union, General and Municipal Workers Union and Electrical, Electronic, Telecommunications and Plumbing Union.  Members in 1979 were:

 Amalgamated Society of Boilermakers, Shipwrights, Blacksmiths and Structural Workers
 Amalgamated Union of Engineering Workers (all four sections held separate memberships)
 Associated Metalworkers' Union
 Association of Patternmakers and Allied Craftsmen
 Association of Professional, Executive, Clerical and Computer Staff
 Association of Scientific, Technical and Managerial Staffs
 Electrical, Electronic, Telecommunications and Plumbing Union
 Furniture, Timber and Allied Trades Union
 General and Municipal Workers' Union
 National Society of Metal Mechanics
 National Union of Domestic Appliance and General Metal Workers
 National Union of Scalemakers
 National Union of Sheet Metal Workers, Coppersmiths, Heating and Domestic Engineers
 Screw, Nut, Bolt and Rivet Trade Union
 Transport and General Workers' Union (Power & Engineering and Automotive Trade Groups)
 Union of Construction, Allied Trades and Technicians

In 1989, membership was still 22 affiliates and 2 million members but, by 2001, this had fallen to 1.2 million members, and a process of union mergers has greatly reduced the number of affiliated unions and the prominence of the organisation.  All current affiliates are also members of the Trades Union Congress.

By 2017 the union had no direct members and was functioning as a federation of the Unite, GMB, Community, Prospect and UCATT trade unions.  Since the merger of UCATT into Unite the number of member unions has fallen to four.

Current members
Community
GMB
Prospect
Unite the Union

General Secretaries
1890: William Mosses
1917: Frank Smith
1937: Ernest Gilbert
1942: Gavin Martin
1957: George Barratt
1970: Jack Service
1978: Alex Ferry
1994: Alan Robson
2004: John Wall
2008: Dave Gibbs
2009: Hugh Scullion
2017: Ian Waddell

Presidents

References

8. Angela Tuckett "The Blacksmiths' History. What Smithy Workers gave Trade Unionism" 1974 p250

External links

Catalogue of the CSEU archives, held at the Modern Records Centre, University of Warwick

National trade union centres of the United Kingdom
Engineering trade unions
Trade unions established in 1890
Shipbuilding trade unions
1890 establishments in England
Trade unions based in London